This is a list of governors of Assam, and other offices of similar scope, from the start of British occupation of the area in 1824 during the First Anglo-Burmese War.

The Governor of Assam is a nominal head and representative of the President of India in the state of Assam.  The governor is appointed by the president for a term of five years. The current governor is Gulab Chand Kataria

Powers and functions

The governor has:

 Executive powers related to administration, appointments and removals
 Legislative powers related to lawmaking and the state legislature, that is Vidhan Sabha or Vidhan Parishad
 Discretionary powers to be carried out according to the discretion of the governor

British military commanders in occupied Assam (1824–26) 
In 1824, British forces occupied Assam, which was politically never part of either India or Burma
 George McMorine, 1824
 Arthur Richards, 1824–26

British political agents in Assam (1826–28) 
On 24 February 1826, the Treaty of Yandaboo ceded portions of Assam from Burma to Britain.

 David Scott, 1826–28

Commissioners of Assam (1828–74) 
In 1828, Western Assam was incorporated into the province of Bengal, followed by the rest of Assam in 1833.  A Commissioner of Assam was appointed, subordinate to the Governor of Bengal.

 David Scott, 1828–20 August 1831, continued
 Thomas Campbell Robertson, 1831–34
 Francis Jenkins, 1834–61
 Henry Hopkinson, 1861–74

Chief commissioners of Assam (1874–1905) 
In 1874, Assam was separated from the Bengal Presidency, and its status was upgraded to a chief commissioner's province.

 Richard Harte Keatinge, 1874–78
 Steuart Colvin Bayley, 1878–81
 Sir Charles Alfred Elliott, 1881–85
 William Erskine Ward, 1885–87, first time
 Sir Dennis Fitzpatrick, 1887–89
 James Westland, 1889
 James Wallace Quinton, 1889–91
 William Erskine Ward, 1891–96, second time
 Sir Henry John Stedman Cotton, 1896–1902
 Sir Joseph Bampfylde Fuller, 1902–05

Lieutenant governors of East Bengal and Assam (1905–12) 
In 1905, Bengal was partitioned and East Bengal and Assam was formed, governed by a lieutenant governor.

 Sir Joseph Bampfylde Fuller, 1905–06
 Lancelot Hare, 1906–11
 Charles Stuart Bayley, 1911–12

Chief commissioners of Assam (1912–21) 
In 1912, East Bengal was re-incorporated into the Bengal presidency, and Assam Province was again governed by a chief commissioner.

 Sir Archdale Earle, 1912–18
 Sir Nicholas Dodd Beatson-Bell, 1918–3 January 1921

Governors of Assam (1921–47) 
In 1921, the chief commissionership was upgraded to governor.

 Sir Nicholas Dodd Beatson-Bell, 3 January 1921 – 2 April 1921
 Sir William Sinclair Marris, 3 April 1921 – 10 October 1922
 Sir John Henry Kerr, 10 October 1922 – 28 June 1927
 Sir Egbert Laurie Lucas Hammond, 28 June 1927 – 11 May 1932
 Sir Michael Keane, 11 May 1932 – 4 March 1937
 Sir Robert Niel Reid, 4 March 1937 – 4 May 1942
 Henry Joseph Twynam, 24 February 1938 – 4 October 1939, (acting for Reid)
 Sir Andrew Gourlay Clow, 4 May 1942 – 4 May 1947
 Frederick Chalmers Bourne, 4 April 1946–?, (acting for Clow)
 Henry Foley Knight, 4 September 1946 – 23 December 1946, (acting for Clow)
 Sir Muhammad Saleh Akbar Hydari, 4 May 1947 – 15 August 1947

Governors of Assam since 1947

See also
 History of Assam
 Chief Minister of Assam
 Governors of India

References

 List of Governors from assamassembly.nic.in
 http://www.worldstatesmen.org/India_states.html#Assam
 http://www.worldstatesmen.org/India_BrProvinces.htm#Assam
 

 
Assam
Governors